The  was a light machine gun used by the Imperial Japanese Army in World War II. It was similar in design to the earlier Type 96 light machine gun, but designed to fire the new and more powerful 7.7 mm Arisaka cartridge, which improved energy by over 50%. Like the Type 96, the Type 99 traces its history to the ZB vz. 26, which also inspired the British Bren light machine gun.

History and development

Prior to the Type 99's development, the Japanese Army was using the Type 96 light machine gun, an improvement over the previous Type 11 light machine gun.  The Type 96 had been introduced into combat service in 1936, and quickly proved to be a versatile weapon to provide covering fire for advancing infantry. Both the earlier Type 11 and current Type 96 light machine guns used the same 6.5x50mmSR Arisaka cartridges as the Type 38 infantry rifle. Using similar ammunition in both guns simplified supply and had the added advantage that any squad member could supply ammunition for the light machine gun, or vice versa.

However, in 1939 the Japanese army was in the process of switching to a larger and more powerful 7.7 mm cartridge which also had no rim, which improved cartridge handling. This more powerful cartridge: 3,136 J energy, compared to the earlier 6.5x50mmSR Arisaka cartridge: 1,966 J energy, required a firearm that had more steel, bigger springs and a heavier bolt to handle the extra forces involved.  This required a switch from the Type 38 rifle to the Type 99 rifle which could handle the more powerful round. Similarly, it was necessary to develop a new version of the Type 96 light machine gun that would also be able to use this new larger caliber; thus the advantages of common ammunition between riflemen and machine gunners could continue. The Type 99 light machine gun was produced at Kokura,  Nagoya Arsenal and Mukden with a total production of about 53,000 weapons.

Design
The Type 99 was basically the same design as the Type 96, and had a number of parts in common. However, it dispensed with the oiler and had better primary extraction, increasing reliability over its predecessors. Early models had a monopod at the stock and a flash suppressor on the muzzle, which was screwed onto a threaded portion of the gun barrel. A top-mounted curved detachable box magazine held 30 rounds, and the finned gun barrel could be rapidly changed to avoid overheating. Like its predecessor, the Type 96, the Type 99 bears a distinct resemblance to the British Bren gun.

The Type 99 had a blade front sight and a leaf rear sight, with graduations from 200 to 1,500 meters, with a wind adjustment. A 2.5X telescopic sight with a 10 degree field of view could be attached at the right side of the gun. These were often issued to the best marksmen of the unit and occasionally employed like a sniper rifle. A standard infantry bayonet could be attached to the gas block below the barrel, but on the battlefield this feature proved inconsequential due to the weight of the gun and the fact that the blade was largely obstructed by the flash hider when it was fixed on the muzzle.

Combat record

The Type 99 came into active service in 1939, and was used alongside the older Type 11 and Type 96, as these models had been produced in large quantities and many front line troops continued to use the Type 38 rifles with their 6.5 mm ammunition. All three weapons remained in service until the end of the war. The Type 99 was used by Communist forces (Chinese and North Korean armies) during the Korean War. It was used by the Viet Minh and the North Vietnamese forces during the First and Second Indochina Wars.

Variants
A limited production version of the Type 99 was produced for paratroopers, but had no known special designation. It had a detachable stock and a forward-folding pistol grip. For deployment, the barrel and butt were detached from the gun, the pistol grip and bipod folded, and the entire set packed into a carrying bag.

The Type 99 can be modified to fire 7.62×51mm NATO ammunition. Only a barrel replacement is required.

Users

See also 
 Type 97 light machine gun

Notes

References

External links
Taki’s Imperial Japanese Army page
US Technical Manual E 30-480
 Japanese Model 99 MG Tactical and Technical Trends No. 35, U.S. War Department 
 JapaneseWeapons.net

Light machine guns
Machine guns of Japan
World War II infantry weapons of Japan
World War II machine guns
Military equipment introduced in the 1930s